Kristina Brandi was the defending champion, but lost in semifinals to Ruxandra Dragomir

Martina Hingis won the title, after Ruxandra Dragomir was forced to retire during the final. The score was 6–2, 3–0.

Seeds
The first two seeds received a bye into the second round.

Draw

Finals

Top half

Bottom half

References
 Official Results Archive (ITF)
 Official Results Archive (WTA)

Rosmalen Grass Court Championships
2000 WTA Tour